The Asphyx, also known as Spirit of the Dead and The Horror of Death, is a 1972 British horror film / science fiction film directed by Peter Newbrook and starring Robert Stephens and Robert Powell.

Asphyx refers to Old Greek asphyxía, "lack of pulse", or English asphyxiation.

Plot
In Victorian England, philanthropic scientist Sir Hugo Cunningham is a member of a parapsychological society that studies psychic phenomena. As part of their latest investigation, the men have begun photographing individuals at the moment of death; done properly, the resultant photos depict a strange smudge hovering around the body. Though the society concludes that they have captured evidence of the soul escaping the body, Cunningham is sceptical.

At a riverside party to celebrate his recent engagement, Cunningham is making home movies with a primitive movie camera of his own invention when his fiancée and son are killed in a boating accident. When Cunningham views the film, he sees that not only has he captured the blur, but that it is moving towards his son, and not away from him. From this, Cunningham concludes that the blur is not the soul but a force known as an "asphyx", a kind of personal Grim Reaper, told of in Greek mythology, which comes for every individual at the moment of his or her death.

While filming a public execution as a protest against capital punishment, Cunningham activates a spotlight that he has crafted using phosphorus stones beneath a drip irrigation valve. Later, when viewing the film with his adopted son Giles, Cunningham sees that the condemned man's asphyx was briefly held suspended in the spotlight's beam. Concluding that an individual's asphyx is an organic force and therefore subject to the laws of physics, Cunningham theorises that some property of the energy released by the combination of phosphorus and water renders the asphyx immobile. If correct, this would mean that an asphyx could be trapped, and that an individual would be immortal so long as their asphyx remained imprisoned.

Cunningham and Giles successfully capture the asphyx of a dying guinea pig and seal it in the family tomb, beneath a spring fuelled by the lake. Seeing immortality in his grasp, Cunningham tasks Giles with helping him to capture his own asphyx, deciding that his contributions to science are too important for him to die. Cunningham commissions the construction of an impenetrable vault door on his family tomb, with a complex combination lock as the only means of opening it; once he has captured his asphyx, Giles is under instruction to seal the asphyx inside, so that no one can ever set it free.

Using an electric chair to slowly kill himself, Cunningham summons his own asphyx. However, Giles is only experienced in capturing an asphyx with two men, and is forced to rely on his fiancée (and stepsister), Christina, for assistance. Christina is horrified with the experiments, but agrees to participate when Cunningham tells her that he will give his blessing for the two to marry if they allow him to make them immortal.

Theorising that imminent death, and not actual death, will summon an asphyx, Cunningham places Christina on a guillotine operated by Giles. During the experiment, the guinea pig chews through a hose pumping water onto the phosphorus stones being used to capture the asphyx. The equipment malfunctions and in the resultant panic, Christina is decapitated and dies.

Despondent, Cunningham insists that Giles open the vault and free his asphyx. Giles agrees, on the condition that Cunningham first grant him immortality. In fact Giles no longer wishes to live without his fiancée and, unbeknownst to Cunningham, he sabotages the procedure by removing the phosphorus stones from the spotlight. As Cunningham attempts to gas Giles to death to summon his asphyx, he realises the equipment is not working, turns off the gas and turns on the oxygen to save Giles. Giles strikes a match. The resulting explosion kills Giles and destroys all of the equipment required to capture asphyxes.

Although Giles left behind the combination to the vault on a slip of paper, Cunningham destroys it, resolving that his own immortality is God's punishment for the deaths of Giles and Christina. In a framing sequence set in the 1970s, an ancient, disfigured Cunningham roams the streets of London with the guinea pig. He wanders into the path of an imminent car collision, which kills both of the drivers; a police officer responding to the scene is shocked to find that Cunningham, crushed beneath the two vehicles, is still alive.

Cast
 Robert Stephens as Sir Hugo Cunningham
 Robert Powell as Giles Cunningham
 Jane Lapotaire as Christina Cunningham
 Alex Scott as Sir Edward Barrett
 Ralph Arliss as Clive Cunningham
 Fiona Walker as Anna Wheatley
 Terry Scully as Pauper
 John Lawrence as Mason
 David Grey as Vicar
 Tony Caunter as Warden
 Paul Bacon as 1st Member

Release

Home media
The Asphyx was released on DVD by Image Entertainment on 3 March 1998. It was later released by Anchor Bay Entertainment on 26 April 2004 and by Hen's Tooth Video on 27 October 2009. It was released on DVD and Blu-ray by Kino Video on 17 April 2012.

Reception

Budd Wilkins from Slant Magazine awarded the film 3.5 out of 5 stars, writing, "Not quite a genre classic, The Asphyx is a mostly intriguing mashup of Victorian ghost story and steampunk revisionism that occasionally threatens to degenerate into inanity with its strident morality-play storyline and escalating improbability factor." Brett Gallman from Oh the Horror gave the film a positive review, calling it "an old fashioned, cathartic tragedy with familial bloodshed, played in garish fashion and with the moralizing pathos of medieval drama." Stuart Galbraith IV from DVD Talk awarded the film 3.5 out of 5 stars, praising the film's cinematography and lighting while criticizing its "clunky" dialogue, stagy blocking, and low budget. Bob Brinkman from HorrorNews.net gave the film a positive review, saying it "conjures a feeling of existential angst as it wrestles with some of the darker philosophical thoughts of life, death, and immortality. With a twist towards the end of the story that is not a gimmick, but instead a well-turned bit of grief-filled misdirection, this is a must see for fans of gothic cinema." TV Guide gave the film a mixed 2/5 stars, writing, "An unusual horror movie with an intriguing premise, The Asphyx is unfortunately marred by a weak script and unimaginative direction."

Legacy
On 30 October 2009, it was announced that Black & Blue Films was planning to shoot a remake of the movie. Slated to begin principal photography in early 2011, the new version was to star Alison Doody in the lead female role, and Matthew McGuchan in the director's seat. The remake failed to secure production finance and was indefinitely shelved, although Terry Rossio remade it as a short film called "Laboratory conditions".

References

External links 
 
 
 

1972 films
1972 horror films
1970s ghost films
1970s science fiction horror films
1970s supernatural horror films
British ghost films
British science fiction horror films
British supernatural horror films
1970s English-language films
Films set in country houses
Films set in England
Films set in the 19th century
Films shot in England
Mad scientist films
Steampunk films
1970s British films